Jõhvi Parish is an Estonian municipality located in Ida-Viru County, consisting of the county capital Jõhvi and its environs.

Settlements

Towns
Jõhvi

Small boroughs
Tammiku

Villages

Religion

Twin administrative entities
Jõhvi is twinned with:

  Loimaa, Finland, since 1997
  Uddevalla, Sweden, since 1997
  Kingisepp, Russia, since 1999
  Thisted, Denmark, since 2000
  Olecko, Poland, since 2006

References

External links
 

 
Municipalities of Estonia